The 2014–15 Nebraska Cornhuskers men's basketball team represented the University of Nebraska–Lincoln in the 2014–15 NCAA Division I men's basketball season. Led by head coach Tim Miles, in his third season, the Cornhuskers team played its home games at Pinnacle Bank Arena in downtown Lincoln, Nebraska, and played its fourth season as a member of the Big Ten Conference. They finished the season 13–18, 5–13 in Big Ten play to finish in twelfth place. They lost in the first round of the Big Ten tournament to Penn State.

Previous season
The Cornhuskers finished the season with an overall record of 19–13, with a record of 11–7 in the Big Ten regular season. In the 2014 Big Ten tournament, the Cornhuskers were defeated by Ohio State, 71–67 in the quarterfinals. They received at-large bid to the 2014 NCAA Division I men's basketball tournament for the first time since 1998. They lost in the second round to Baylor.

Off-season

Departures

Incoming transfers

Incoming recruits

Roster

Schedule 

|-
!colspan=9 style="background: #E11D38; color: #ffffff"| Exhibition

|-
!colspan=9 style="background: #E11D38; color: #ffffff"| Regular season

|-
!colspan=9 style="background: #E11D38; color: #ffffff"| Big Ten regular season

|-
!colspan=9 style="background: #E11D38; color: #ffffff"| Big Ten tournament

Rankings

See also
2014–15 Nebraska Cornhuskers women's basketball team

References

Nebraska
Nebraska Cornhuskers men's basketball seasons
Corn
Corn